Ian Frederick Simpemba (born 28 March 1983) is an Irish former semi-professional footballer who most recently played for Eastbourne Borough as a defender. Simpemba played for Wycombe Wanderers in the Football League Second Division in the 2002–03 and 2003–04 seasons. Simpemba signed for Eastbourne Borough in September 2013 and was made club captain. Simpemba was club captain until 2017, after that he became a Player-Coach at the club.

Career statistics

References

External links

1983 births
Living people
Association footballers from Dublin (city)
Republic of Ireland association footballers
Association football defenders
Wycombe Wanderers F.C. players
Woking F.C. players
Crawley Town F.C. players
Aldershot Town F.C. players
Lewes F.C. players
Havant & Waterlooville F.C. players
Ebbsfleet United F.C. players
Dover Athletic F.C. players
Eastbourne Borough F.C. players
English Football League players
National League (English football) players